Olga's Summer is a 2004 German drama film directed by Nina Grosse. It was entered into the 26th Moscow International Film Festival.

Cast
 Clémence Poésy as Olga
 Bruno Todeschini as Daniel Sax
 Katja Flint as Caroline Sax
 Sebastian Blomberg as Franc
 Sunnyi Melles as Ella
 Wotan Wilke Möhring as Paul
 Hanns Zischler as Richard

References

External links
 

2004 films
2004 drama films
German drama films
2000s German-language films
Films about comics
2000s German films